Joseph Thomas Keable, VC, MM (5 May 1892 – 9 June 1918) was a Canadian soldier during the First World War. Keable was a recipient of the Victoria Cross, the highest and most prestigious award for gallantry in the face of the enemy that can be awarded to British and Commonwealth forces. He was the first French Canadian soldier to be decorated with the VC and Military Medal.

Mostly wrongly spelled Kaeble in English, his actual name at baptism was Keable. His name is also oddly spelled Kable in a page of the 1911 Census of Canada.

Biography
He was born on 5 May 1892 in Saint-Moïse, Quebec.
He joined the Canadian Expeditionary Force in March 1916. Kaeble was a corporal in the 22e Battalion (Canadien Francais), CEF. On 8 June 1918 at Neuville-Vitasse, France, Kaeble performed an act of bravery for which he was awarded the Victoria Cross. He died whilst doing so.

Citation

Burial and legacy
He was buried in the local cemetery in Wanquetin, some seven miles west of Arras (Wanquetin Communal Cemetery: Plot II. Row A. Grave 8. Headstone).

At CFB Valcartier, honours to Keable include Mount Keable, just east of Camp Vimy; a street on the base; and the Keable Club, the privates' and corporals' mess. On 10 February 2011, the Department of Fisheries and Oceans announced that the nine new vessels in a new class of midshore patrol vessels would be named the Hero-class patrol vessels.
The second of the new vessels was named CCGS Caporal Keable V.C.,                                and was presented to the Coast Guard on 13 November 2012.

References

Further reading 
Monuments to Courage (David Harvey, 1999)
The Register of the Victoria Cross (This England, 1997)
VCs of the First World War - Spring Offensive 1918 (Gerald Gliddon, 1997)

External links
Joseph Keable's digitized military service file
Biography at the Dictionary of Canadian Biography Online
Joseph Keable biography on the Canadian Virtual War Memorial
Joseph Thomas Keable biography on DND's Directorate of History and Heritage
Legion Magazine Article on Joseph Keable
Detailed biography of Joseph Keable by Jacques Castonguay

Canadian World War I recipients of the Victoria Cross
1892 births
1918 deaths
Canadian military personnel killed in World War I
Canadian recipients of the Military Medal
People from Bas-Saint-Laurent
Canadian people of German descent
Francophone Quebec people
Canadian Expeditionary Force soldiers
Canadian military personnel from Quebec
Burials in France